Albert Park/Radisson Heights is a residential neighbourhood in the southeast quadrant of Calgary, Alberta. It is bounded to the west by the Bow River and Deerfoot Trail, to the north by Memorial Drive and to the south by 17 Avenue SE. The community of Forest Lawn lies to the east.

This community, established in 1910, enjoys ample open space, is well provided with public and separate schools, has good access to shopping and citywide transportation
routes, and has views of the Bow River Valley, the Downtown and the Canadian Rockies.

The community has an area redevelopment plan in place and is part of the International Avenue Business Revitalization Zone.

It is represented in the Calgary City Council by the Ward 9 councillor.

Demographics 

Residents in this community had a median household income of $38,019 in 2000. As of 2000, 25.9% of the residents were immigrants. A proportion of 40.2% of the buildings were condominiums or apartments, and 58% of the housing was used for renting.

Attractions 
Albert Park and Radisson Heights are close to Downtown Calgary. Inglewood, Fort Calgary Historic Park and the Calgary Zoo, are just moments away. The Max Bell Centre (ice hockey arena) is located immediately west of Radisson Heights.

In 2002, Radisson Heights was the first community in Calgary to have its own Wi-Fi internet service and was managed by WestNet Wireless.

Education 
This neighbourhood has one public elementary school: Radisson Park Elementary School (K-5) built in 2006. There were two other elementary schools that were closed and merged into Radisson Park Elementary School, angering some southwest residents who have no community elementary schools.

References

External links 
Albert Park-Radisson Heights Community Association 

Neighbourhoods in Calgary